Nizhnyaya Bikberda (Tübänge Bikbirźe) is a rural locality (a village) in Bikbausky Selsoviet, Zianchurinsky District, Bashkortostan, Russia. The population was 268 as of 2010. There are 4 streets.

Geography 
Nizhnyaya Bikberda is located 23 km northeast of Isyangulovo (the district's administrative centre) by road. Verkhnyaya Bikberda is the nearest rural locality.

References 

Rural localities in Zianchurinsky District